Ghulam Ahmad Bilour (born 25 December 1939) is a Pakistani politician who served as a member of the National Assembly of Pakistan from 2008 to 2018. He additionally served as Federal Minister for Railways twice and as Federal Minister for Local Government and Rural Development once.

Early life and education 
Bilour was born on 25 December 1939 in Peshawar, Khyber Pakhtunkhwa. He received his early education from Khudad Model School and Islamia School Peshawar, He then studied at Edwardes College and married soon later.

He hails from Bajaur Agency, and comes from a well-known and wealthy business family. He is popularly known as Haji Sahab in Peshawar.

Political career 
Bilour participated in the election campaign of Fatima Jinnah in the 1965 Pakistani presidential election.

He began his political career after joining the Awami National Party (ANP) in the 1970s, and was elected to the Senate of Pakistan in 1975.

He ran for the seat of the National Assembly of Pakistan in the 1988 Pakistani general election from Constituency NA-1 (Peshawar-I), but was unsuccessful and lost the seat to Aftab Ahmad Khan Sherpao. However he re-ran for the seat in by-elections held following the 1988 and was elected to the National Assembly by winning it for the first time.

He was re-elected to the National Assembly for the second time in the 1990 Pakistani general election from Constituency NA-1 (Peshawar-I) after defeating Benazir Bhutto. Following the election, he was appointed as the Federal Minister for Railways, a position he held from 1991 to 1993.

He ran for the seat of the National Assembly of Pakistan in the 1993 Pakistani general election from Constituency NA-1 (Peshawar-I), but was unsuccessful and lost the seat to Syed Zafar Ali Shah.

He was re-elected to the National Assembly in the 1997 Pakistani general election from Constituency NA-1 (Peshawar-I). He didn't contest for seat of the National Assembly in the 2002 Pakistani general election.

DAWN reported that he has been jailed several time during his political career. Most notably in 2007 when he was nominated in the murder case of Syed Qammar Abbas. Bilour denied the charge. Earlier in 1997, Syed Qammar Abbas was nominated in a murder case of the son of Bilour.

He was re-elected to the National Assembly from Constituency NA-1 (Peshawar-I) in the 2008 Pakistani general election. Following the election, he was appointed as the Federal Minister for Local Government and Rural Development. He was then appointed Federal Minister for Railways in November 2008.

DAWN reported that Bilour during his tenure as Minister for Railways was criticised and was alleged for corruption. In 2012, Bilour was named as an accused in a multi-billion scrap scandal, which was investigated by the National Accountability Bureau (NAB).

He ran for the seat of the National Assembly of Pakistan in the 2013 Pakistani general election from Constituency NA-1 (Peshawar-I), but was unsuccessful and lost the seat to Imran Khan However he re-ran for the seat in by-elections held in July 2013 and was elected to the National Assembly by winning it.

He ran for the seat of the National Assembly from Constituency NA-31 (Peshawar-V) as a candidate of ANP in 2018 Pakistani general election but was unsuccessful. He received 42,476 votes and lost the seat to Shokat Ali, a candidate of PTI.

He ran for the seat of the National Assembly from Constituency NA-31 (Peshawar-V) as a candidate of ANP in 2022 Pakistan by-elections but was unsuccessful. He received 32,252 votes and lost the seat to Imran Khan.

Calling for assassinations 
In 2012, during his tenure as Federal Minister for Railways, he offered a US$100,000 reward for the assassination of the maker of an anti-Islam film, the Innocence of Muslims. He also sought support of members of the Taliban and al Qaeda and was quoted saying "that if members of the banned militant organisations kill the maker of the blasphemous movie, they will also be rewarded." Following the statement of Bilour, he was criticised and his party ANP distanced itself from the statement of Bilour, however ANP decided not to take any action against Bilour. In response the Tehrik-i-Taliban Pakistan said they were allowing Bilour an "amnesty" from their hit list because his views "represent the true spirit of Islam."

In 2015, during his tenure as member of the National Assembly, he announced a $200,000 bounty for the [head of the] owner of French satirical weekly Charlie Hebdo that published blasphemous caricatures [and] $100,000 compensation for the families of those [who] killed [11 people] during the Charlie Hebdo shooting in Paris.

References 

Living people
1939 births
People from Peshawar
Pakistani MNAs 2013–2018
Awami National Party politicians
Edwardes College alumni
Pakistani MNAs 2008–2013
Pakistani MNAs 1988–1990
Pakistani MNAs 1990–1993
Pakistani MNAs 1997–1999
Minister of Railways (Pakistan)